The winners of the 5th Hollywood Critics Association Midseason Film Awards, presented by the Hollywood Critics Association, were revealed on July 1, 2022, on the association's official Facebook, Instagram, Twitter, and YouTube pages.

The nominations were announced on June 28, 2022. Everything Everywhere All at Once received the most nominations with eight, followed by The Batman with six.

Everything Everywhere All at Once also won the most awards, winning seven out of its eight nominations and every category it was eligible for, including Best Picture and Best Director.

Winners and nominees
Winners are listed first and highlighted with boldface.

Films with multiple wins
The following film received multiple awards:

Films with multiple nominations
The following films received multiple nominations:

See also
 2nd Hollywood Critics Association TV Awards
 6th Hollywood Critics Association Film Awards
 1st Hollywood Critics Association Creative Arts Awards

References

External links
 

H
2022 in American cinema
2022 awards in the United States
Midseason Film Awards 05